Anarsia protensa is a moth of the family Gelechiidae. It was described by Kyu-Tek Park in 1995. It is found in Japan (Honshu, Kyushu) and Taiwan.

The wingspan is about 15 mm.

The larvae feed on Elaeagnus pungens. They bore in the fruits of the host plant. Mature larvae are reddish brown.

References

protensa
Moths described in 1995
Moths of Japan
Moths of Taiwan